The Clifford Percival Smith House, also known as the Walker House, is a historic house in Houma, Louisiana, U.S.. It was built circa 1905 for Clifford Percival Smith and his wife, Clara. It belonged to the Smith family until 1986. By the late 1980s, it belonged to the Walker family.

The house was designed in the Queen Anne architectural style, with Colonial Revival features. It has been listed on the National Register of Historic Places since April 20, 1989.

References

National Register of Historic Places in Terrebonne Parish, Louisiana
Queen Anne architecture in Louisiana
Colonial Revival architecture in Louisiana
Houses completed in 1905
1905 establishments in Louisiana